Martijn de Vries (born 28 March 1992) is a Dutch former footballer who played in the Eredivisie for Excelsior.

External links

1992 births
Living people
Dutch footballers
Excelsior Rotterdam players
Sparta Rotterdam players
Eredivisie players
Footballers from Rotterdam
Association football defenders